Alexandre-Joseph Doucet (November 1, 1880 – July 28, 1951) was a farmer and political figure in New Brunswick, Canada. He represented Kent in the House of Commons of Canada from 1923 to 1926 as a Conservative.

He was born in Grand Étang, Nova Scotia, the son of Joseph-Romuald Doucet and Sophie Le Blanc. Doucet was a farmer at Notre-Dame, Kent County. In 1903, he married Philomène Le Blanc. Doucet ran unsuccessfully for a seat in the House of Commons in 1921. He was first elected to the House of Commons in a 1923 by-election held following the death of Auguste Théophile Léger. He served on the municipal council for Dundas from 1923 to 1925. Doucet was defeated when he ran for reelection in 1926, 1935 and 1945. He was a director of the Potato Grower's Association of New Brunswick and auditor for the Farmer's Co-operative Creamery of Moncton. Doucet died in Moncton at the age of 70.

Electoral record

References

Members of the House of Commons of Canada from New Brunswick
Conservative Party of Canada (1867–1942) MPs
1880 births
1951 deaths